Shang Yichen (born 9 April 2000) is a Chinese badminton player from Shanghai. He is part of the Chinese team that won gold in the 2018 BWF World Junior Championships.

Career 
Shang partnered with Liang Weikeng and won a bronze medal at the 2018 BWF World Junior Championships in the men's doubles event. He also won a bronze in mixed doubles with Zhang Shuxian. Shang won a silver medal with Liang at the 2018 Badminton Asia Junior Championships after losing to compatriots Di Zijian and Wang Chang in the final.

In 2019, Shang and Liang achieved runner-up position at the Malaysia International.

In 2022, he formed a partnership with Chen Sihang in men's doubles. They reached the quarterfinals of the Polish International in September.

Achievements

World Junior Championships 
Boys' doubles

Asian Junior Championships 
Boys' doubles

BWF International Challenge/Series (1 runner-up) 
Men's doubles

BWF Junior International (2 titles) 
Boys' doubles

  BWF Junior International Grand Prix tournament
  BWF Junior International Challenge tournament
  BWF Junior International Series tournament
  BWF Junior Future Series tournament

References

External links 

 

2000 births
Living people
Badminton players from Shanghai
Chinese male badminton players